Madia elegans is an annual herbaceous plant species in the family Asteraceae. It is generally known as the common madia, but there are several subspecies known by various common names.

Description
Madia elegans is covered with short, stiff hairs. Glands are borne on stalks, especially near the flowers. The showy flower varies in appearance across subspecies and even within subspecies. The flower has numerous thin ray flowers, which close at night, and several central disk flowers. It may be solid lemon yellow or have a maroon center. Its fruits are achenes.

Taxonomy

Subspecies 
Madia elegans densifolia - showy tarweed
Madia elegans elegans - common madia
Madia elegans vernalis - spring madia
Madia elegans wheeleri - Wheeler's tarweed

Etymology 
The foliage of species in the genus has sticky hairs, hence the common name tarweed.

Distribution and habitat 
The plant is native to western North America from south-central Washington state to northern Baja California. It may be found in dry open forest, disturbed areas and grasslands from low to high elevations.

Uses 
The achenes were historically used as food by Native Americans, including the Pomo and Miwok, who baked them or ground them into flour.

References

External links

Jepson Manual Treatment: Madia elegans
U. of Michigan Ethnobotany: Madia elegans
Madia elegans — CalPhotos gallery

elegans
Flora of California
Flora of Nevada
Flora of Oregon
Flora of Washington (state)
Flora of the Cascade Range
Flora of the Klamath Mountains
Flora of the Sierra Nevada (United States)
Natural history of the California chaparral and woodlands
Natural history of the California Coast Ranges
Natural history of the Central Valley (California)
Natural history of the Peninsular Ranges
Natural history of the San Francisco Bay Area
Natural history of the Santa Monica Mountains
Natural history of the Transverse Ranges
Plants used in Native American cuisine
Flora without expected TNC conservation status